The statue of Bernard Montgomery, 1st Viscount Montgomery of Alamein is located outside the Ministry of Defence Main Building in Whitehall, London, United Kingdom. It was designed by Oscar Nemon and stands alongside statues of William Slim, 1st Viscount Slim and Alan Brooke, 1st Viscount Alanbrooke.

Description
The bronze plinth's front reads: "Monty, Field Marshal, Viscount Montgomery of Alamein, KG GCB DSO, 1887–1976." The back reads:
1942–44, Commander, 8th Army North Africa & Italy
1944–45, C in C, 21st Army Group, North West Europe
1946–48, Chief of the Imperial General Staff
1951–58, Deputy Supreme Commander, Allied Powers Europe
Erected by comrades in arms & friends

References

External links
 
 Oscar Nemon supervising the installation of his statue of Field Marshal Viscount Montgomery, National Portrait Gallery

Bronze sculptures in the United Kingdom
Military memorials in London
Outdoor sculptures in London
Montgomery
Montgomery
Whitehall
1980 sculptures
1980 establishments in England
1980 in London